Rafflesia kemumu is a parasitic plant species of the genus Rafflesia. It is endemic to the Indonesian island of Sumatra.

References

speciosa
Endemic flora of Sumatra